Éric Assous (30 March 1956 – 12 October 2020) was a French director, screenwriter, dialoguist, and dramatist born in Tunis.

Career
Assous was the author of 80 radio plays for the France Inter channel.

He wrote numerous plays, as well as scenarios for television (including 3 episodes of the Nestor Burma series) and cinema.

Assous directed his first feature film,  in 2001.

In 2002, he penned a new comedy entitled .

Filmography

Director 
 1999: À cause d'Olivia... short film
 2001: Les gens en maillot de bain ne sont pas (forcément) superficiels
 2002: Sexes très opposés
 2003: Amour tout court

Screenwriter 
 Les acteurs sont fatigués (Prochainement), by Olivier Marchal
 2010: 22 Bullets by Richard Berry
 2008: Nos 18 ans by Frédéric Berthe
 2008: Love Me No More by Jean Becker
 2008: Les Randonneurs à Saint-Tropez by Philippe Harel
 2005: The Black Box by Richard Berry
 2005: Tu vas rire, mais je te quitte by Philippe Harel
 2003: I, Cesar by Richard Berry
 2002: Sexes très opposés (2002)
 2002: Irène by Ivan Calbérac
 2001: The Girl from Paris by Christian Carion
 2001: Les gens en maillot de bain ne sont pas (forcément) superficiels by Éric Assous
 1998: Petits Désordres amoureux by Olivier Péray
 1997: The Banned Woman by Philippe Harel
 1997: Les Randonneurs by Philippe Harel
 1993: Une femme pour moi by Arnaud Sélignac
 1987: Babette (Intrigues) by Emmanuel Fonlladosa

 Dialoguist 
 2005: Tu vas rire, mais je te quitte by Philippe Harel
 2002: Sexes très opposés Theatre 
 1992: Sans mentir, directed by d'Éric Assous and Bernard Menez, Théâtre des Bouffes-Parisiens
 1992: Une fille entre nous, Théâtre d'Edgar
 1995: Le Portefeuille by Pierre Sauvil and Éric Assous, directed by Jean-Luc Moreau, Théâtre Saint-Georges
 1998: Couple en turbulences, Comédie de Paris
 2002: Les acteurs sont fatigués, directed by de Jacques Décombe, Comédie-Caumartin
 2002: Retour de Madison, directed by Éric Assous, played by Roger Miremont, Festival Off, Avignon.
 2004: Les Montagnes russes, played by Alain Delon and Astrid Veillon in 2004 and 2005, Théâtre Marigny
 2007: Les Belles-Sœurs, directed by Jean-Luc Moreau, Théâtre Saint-Georges (and tour in 2008)
 2008: Secret de famille, directed by Jean-Luc Moreau, with Michel Sardou and Davy Sardou, Théâtre des Variétés. 
 2009: Les hommes préfèrent mentir, directed by Jean-Luc Moreau, Théâtre Saint-Georges
 2009: L'Illusion conjugale, directed by Jean-Luc Moreau, Théâtre de l'Œuvre
 2010: Le Technicien, directed by Jean-Luc Moreau, Théâtre du Palais-Royal
 2011: Une journée ordinaire, directed by Jean-Luc Moreau, Théâtre des Bouffes-Parisiens
 2011: Les Conjoints, directed by Jean-Luc Moreau, Théâtre Tristan-Bernard
 2011: Mon meilleur copain, directed by Jean-Luc Moreau, Théâtre des Nouveautés
 2012: L'Italienne, directed by David Garcia, Théâtre Le Funambule Montmartre
 2012: Le Bonheur, directed by Jean-Luc Moreau, Théâtre Marigny
 2013: Nos femmes, directed by Richard Berry, Théâtre de Paris
 2015: On ne se mentira jamais, directed by Jean-Luc Moreau, Théâtre La Bruyère (adapted into English by Stewart Vaughan as No more lies)
 2015: Représailles, directed by Anne Bourgeois, Théâtre de la Michodière
 2016: L'heureux élu, directed by Jean Luc Moreau, Théâtre de la Madeleine

 Prizes and nominations 
 2010: Molière de l'auteur francophone vivant for L'Illusion conjugale 2014: Grand prix du théâtre de l'Académie française for all his theatre work
 2015: Molière de l'auteur francophone vivant for On ne se mentira jamais ! References 

 External links 

 Éric Assous on SACD
 Représailles, l'art changeant d'Éric Assous on Le Figaro'' (31 October 2015)
 Éric Assous on uniFrance
 Eric Assous, l'auteur le plus prolifique du théâtre privé on France Info
 Le Bonheur - Eric Assous on YouTube

French film directors
French male screenwriters
21st-century French dramatists and playwrights
1956 births
People from Tunis
2020 deaths
21st-century French screenwriters
21st-century French male writers
20th-century French dramatists and playwrights
20th-century French screenwriters
20th-century French male writers
French male dramatists and playwrights
French television writers
Male television writers